They Lived That Spring is a novel by F. J. Thwaites.

It was adapted for radio in 1947.

References

External links
They Lived That Spring at AustLit

1946 Australian novels